Adolf Bohlin (born 9 March 1873) was a Swedish missionary. He served with the Mission Union of Sweden in Chinese Turkestan (present day Xinjiang).  Born Adolf Fredrik Persson in Tived, Skaraborg, Sweden, he was the ninth child of 12 for Per Erik Persson and Maja Cajsa Jacobsdotter.  In late 1920 he moved to Los Angeles, California where he worked as a gardener through retirement.

Bibliography
J. Lundahl (editor), På obanade stigar: Tjugofem år i Ost-Turkestan. Stockholm, Svenska Missionsförbundet Förlag, 1917

External links
Mission and Change in Eastern Turkestan (English Translation of select chapters of Mission och revolution i Centralasien)

Swedish Protestant missionaries
Protestant missionaries in China
Christian missionaries in Central Asia
1873 births
Year of death missing
Swedish expatriates in China